Grass yellow or grass yellows may refer to:
Eurema, a genus of butterflies commonly called the grass yellows
Eurema hecabe, a species in this genus usually called the common grass yellow or large grass yellow

Animal common name disambiguation pages